Lissonoschema solangeae is a species of beetle in the family Cerambycidae. It was described by Martins & Monné in 2000.

References

Trachyderini
Beetles described in 2000